Tokyo Adventures, previously known as Boba Fett, were a four-piece pop punk/rock band from the Wirral, England. They released two albums as Tokyo Adventures and various EPs.

Tokyo Adventures played their final gig on 5 August 2006 at the Munkyfest festival near Frodsham, Cheshire.

Band members
Tony Keenan, vocals and guitar
Steve Carpenter, drums and vocals
Sean Evans, guitar and vocals
Anna Macdonald, bass and vocals (1998-2003)
Paul Stearne, bass and vocals (2004-2006)

History
The band formed under the name Boba Fett (after the Star Wars character) in 1998. In November 2000 they changed their name to Tokyo Adventures. Early demos were self-released CD-Rs. The albums We Have The Technology, One Kiss For Luck and Hunter's Handbook were released and distributed by Keith Records/Boss Tuneage.

Discography

Albums
Hard Sums, Solved By Abacus (1998, as Boba Fett)
Ulimat Skware Frisbee (2000, as Boba Fett)
One Kiss For Luck (2001)
Hunter's Handbook (2004)

E.P.s
We Have The Technology (2000)
Punctuation E.P. (2004)
Clinkers and Winnits E.P. (2004)
Deballare Superbos! (2006)

Others
 Tokyo Adventures Just Had A Fight With Three Minute Margin... - split album with Three Minute Margin
Several exclusive tracks were released on the Keith Records, Munkyfest and Boss Tuneage compilation albums.

External links
 Official website
 Official Tokyo Adventures myspace
 BBC unsigned band of the month

English pop punk groups
Musical groups from Liverpool
Musical groups established in 1998
Musical groups disestablished in 2006